Javier Artiñano (1942 – 4 July 2013) was a Spanish costume designer.

Selected filmography

References

External links
 

1942 births
2013 deaths
Spanish costume designers
People from San José Province